The Festival of Pacific Arts, Pacific Arts Festival, or FESTPAC is a traveling festival hosted every four years, in the same year as the Summer Olympics, by a different country in Oceania (map). It was conceived by the Pacific Community (former "Secretariat of the Pacific Community") as a means to stem erosion of traditional cultural practices by sharing and exchanging culture at each festival.  The major theme of the festival is traditional song and dance.  The 2008 Festival of Pacific Arts was hosted by American Samoa from 20 July to 2 August 2008; it was the 10th Festival of Pacific Arts.

Organisation 
The Pacific Cultural Council (former "Pacific Arts Council" or "Council of Pacific Arts," originally "South Pacific Arts Festival Council") selects the host country and recognizes that each participating country desires the opportunity to showcase its unique indigenous culture by hosting the festival.  Host selection is based on principles of equity and preference is given to countries which have not yet hosted.  The festival host country pays participants' costs of local travel, accommodation, meals, and other forms of hospitality. Entry to all artistic events is free to the public thereby maximizing cultural outreach and inclusion.

By its vastness, the Pacific Ocean inhibits social and cultural interchange between the inhabitants of its mostly island countries.  The festival, not a competition but a cultural exchange, reunites people and reinforces regional identity and mutual appreciation of Pacific-wide culture.  Participating countries select artist-delegates to represent the nation at this crossroads of cultures, considered a great honour.

2008 festival 
About 2,000 artists attended the 2008 Festival of Pacific Arts from these participating countries: American Samoa, Australia, Cook Islands, Easter Island, Federated States of Micronesia, Fiji, French Polynesia, Guam, Hawaii, Kiribati, Marshall Islands, Nauru, New Caledonia, New Zealand, Niue, Norfolk Island, Northern Mariana Islands, Palau, Papua New Guinea, Pitcairn Islands, Samoa, Solomon Islands, Tokelau, Tonga, Tuvalu, Vanuatu, and Wallis and Futuna. Taiwan was allowed to send a delegation of 80 performers and artists, most of whom were Taiwanese aborigines, to the Festival of Pacific Arts for the first time in 2008.

2012 festival 
Doreen Kuper was the Chair of the Festival of Pacific Arts that was held in Honiara in 2012. The festival attracted an audience of 200,000 people, with 3,000 performers from twenty-four countries taking part. During her time as Chair, Kuper led calls for the repatriation of art and artefacts to the Solomon Islands from non-Pacific countries.

Locations

See also
Austronesian peoples
Pasifika Festival, annual one-day Polynesian festival in the month of March, attracting up to 200,000 in Auckland, New Zealand.
Bernice P. Bishop Museum, in Honolulu, Hawaii, houses the world's largest collection of Polynesian artifacts.  It is also known as the Hawaii State Museum of Natural and Cultural History.
Pacific Islands for Melanesia, Micronesia, Polynesia groupings synopsis.
Artists from Hawaii (links to Hawaiian artists category)
List of Hawaiian cultural topics (links to Hawaiian culture category)
New Zealand artists (links to New Zealand artists category)
Hawaiian Renaissance
History of Indigenous Australians
History of the Pacific Islands

References

External links
 Festival of Pacific Arts web site (redirects to current host site)
 Pacific Arts Association website An independent association devoted to the study of all the arts of Oceania.
 Pacific Arts Alliance Host of First Artists' Forum at the 10th Festival of Pacific Arts
Pacific Community web site has Organizational and support information
 Frommer's Event Guide
 
 2016 Guam Festival of Pacific Arts website 

Cultural festivals in Oceania
Festivals in Oceania
Polynesian festivals
Arts festivals in Oceania
Festivals established in 1972
Music festivals in Oceania
Cultural festivals in American Samoa
Cultural festivals in Fiji
Cultural festivals in Papua New Guinea
Cultural festivals in New Zealand
Cultural festivals in Australia
Cultural festivals in Hawaii
Cultural festivals in Guam
Cultural festivals in the Solomon Islands
Cultural festivals in Palau
Cultural festivals in New Caledonia
Cultural festivals in Samoa
Cultural festivals in the Cook Islands
Cultural festivals in French Polynesia
1972 establishments in Oceania